Four ships of the Royal Navy have borne the name HMS Boreas, after Boreas, the personification of the north wind in Greek mythology. A fourth was planned to bear the name, but never actually did:

  was a 28-gun sixth rate launched in 1757 and declared obsolete and scrapped in 1770.
  was a 28-gun sixth rate launched in 1774, used as a slop ship from 1797 and sold in 1802.
  was a  launched in 1806. She wrecked off the coast of Guernsey on 28 November 1807 with the loss of half her crew of 154 men.
The name was not used though.
  was a  launched in 1930. She was loaned to the Greek navy and between 1944 and 1951 served as HHMS Salamis. The Greeks returned her in 1951. She was sold that same year and scrapped in 1952.

See also 
 

Royal Navy ship names